Shaheen Foundation is a welfare foundation of the Pakistan Air Force. Shaheen Foundation works in different sectors ranging from education to aviation.

Companies 
 FM 100 radio
 Shaheen Airport Services
 Shaheen Aerotraders
 Shaheen Knitwear
 Shaheen Complex, Karachi
 Shaheen Complex, Lahore
 Shaheen Medical Services
 Hawk Advertising
 Fazaia Welfare Education School System
 Fazaia Housing society
 SAPS Aviation College
 Air Eagle Aviation Academy
 Shaheen Welfare Housing Scheme, Peshawar.
 Shaheen Air International (former)
 Shaheen School System

See also 
 Fauji Foundation

References

External links

Pakistan Air Force
Conglomerate companies of Pakistan
1977 establishments in Pakistan
Conglomerate companies established in 1977
Companies based in Islamabad